The Carbine Club Stakes is a Victoria Racing Club Group 3 Thoroughbred horse race for three-year-olds, at set weights with penalties, over a distance of 1600 metres. It is held annually at Flemington Racecourse in Melbourne, Australia during the VRC Spring Racing Carnival.  The total prize money for the race is A$500,000.

History
The race is named in honour of Carbine, a champion in the 19th century, winner of the Victoria Derby who made also a prolific impact in breeding of thoroughbreds in Australia and England.

The race is run on the first day of the VRC Spring Carnival, Victoria Derby day.

Grade
 1983–1997 - Listed Race
 1998 onwards - Group 3

Winners

 2022 - Perfect Thought
 2021 - Fangirl
 2020 - Crosshaven
 2019 - Dalasan
 2018 - Ranier
 2017 - Levendi
 2016 - Comin' Through
 2015 - Mahuta
 2014 - Kermadec
 2013 - Paximadia
 2012 - Lunar Rise
 2011 - Galah
 2010 - Mr Chard
 2009 - Kidnapped
 2008 - Dr Doute's
 2007 - Zacroona
 2006 - Permaiscuous
 2005 - Testifiable
 2004 - Al Maher
 2003 - Sir Dex
 2002 - Delago Brom
 2001 - All Courage
 2000 - Inspire
 1999 - Over
 1998 - Toy Carousel
 1997 - Antiquity
 1996 - Kailey Choice
 1995 - Saintly
 1994 - Perfect Harmony
 1993 - Voting
 1992 - Baskerville
 1991 - Rapan Boy
 1990 - Pre Record
 1989 - Submariner
 1988 - Wonder Dancer
 1987 - Top Innings
 1986 - Warned
 1985 - Shankhill Lass
 1984 - Brave Salute
 1983 - Wage Freeze 
 1982 - Emancipation

See also
 List of Australian Group races
 Group races

References

Horse races in Australia